Twin Lakes Secondary School is a secondary school located in Orillia, Ontario. In March 2008, a review process began to consolidate Orillia's three public high schools into two buildings as a result of cost of maintenance of the aging buildings and the declining enrollment at Park Street Collegiate Institute. As of 2013, Twin Lakes is now one of the two remaining public high schools. Twin Lakes' principal is Julie Richardson and vice principals are Michael Fogarty and Katie Prentice.

The superintendent of the school is Matthew Webbe. (Area B schools- Orillia, Oro-Medonte & Ramara and Springwater).

Programs

TLSS has:  Extended French, Life and Skills courses, Co-operative education programs, music, art and drama programs, transportation, construction, yearbook, and computer technology.

Sport
Boys'/Girls' Soccer, Boys'/Girls' Rugby, Boys'/Girls' Hockey, Boys'/Girls' Basketball, Boys'/Girls' Volleyball, Track & Field, Girls' Flag Football, Nordic Skiing, Swim Team

See also
List of high schools in Ontario

References

External links
Twin Lakes Secondary School

High schools in Simcoe County
Educational institutions in Canada with year of establishment missing
Buildings and structures in Orillia